The following is a list of episodes for the television sitcom Evening Shade. The series premiered on September 21, 1990 and ended on May 23, 1994, with a total of 100 episodes over the course of 4 seasons.

Series overview

Episodes

Season 1 (1990–91)

Season 2 (1991–92)

Season 3 (1992–93)

Season 4 (1993–94)

External links
 

Evening Shade